Abdullah Al-Rashidi (born August 23, 1963) is a Kuwaiti sport shooter and three-time world champion. He competed at the Summer Olympics in 1996, 2000, 2004, 2008, 2012, 2016, and 2020, winning bronze medals in men's skeet in both 2016 and 2020.

Achievements 
Abdullah Al-Rashidi won three gold medals at the World Shooting Championships, in 1995, 1997 and 1998 and in 2011 he took a bronze medal. Competing since 1989, he is also the winner of four World cup events. He has six gold and three silver medals from Asian Shooting Championships and two gold and one silver medal from Asian Games.

2016 Olympic games
In the 2016 Summer Olympics, Al-Rashidi competed as an "independent Olympic athlete" because Kuwait was banned from the Olympics by the IOC over government interference in sport. He won the qualification, finished fourth in the semifinals and won the bronze medal match against Ukraine's Mikola Milchev, the winner from Sydney in 2000.

As his status of being an independent Olympian did not enable the restriction of the uniform of his national team, he received media attention for competing whilst wearing the training shirt of Arsenal F.C. despite not being a supporter himself, leading to people on social media to draw comparison to him and the team's performance in the Premier League.

Al-Rashidi won his second Olympic bronze medal in the 2020 Summer Olympics in Tokyo, this time competing for Kuwait.

Olympic results

References

External links

1963 births
Living people
Asian Games medalists in shooting
Asian Games gold medalists for Kuwait
Asian Games silver medalists for Kuwait
Asian Games bronze medalists for Kuwait
Kuwaiti male sport shooters
Medalists at the 1994 Asian Games
Medalists at the 1998 Asian Games
Medalists at the 2006 Asian Games
Medalists at the 2010 Asian Games
Medalists at the 2014 Asian Games
Medalists at the 2016 Summer Olympics
Medalists at the 2020 Summer Olympics
Olympic bronze medalists for Kuwait
Olympic bronze medalists as Independent Olympic Participants
Olympic medalists in shooting
Olympic shooters as Independent Olympic Participants
Olympic shooters of Kuwait
Shooters at the 1994 Asian Games
Shooters at the 1998 Asian Games
Shooters at the 2006 Asian Games
Shooters at the 2010 Asian Games
Shooters at the 2014 Asian Games
Shooters at the 2018 Asian Games
Shooters at the 1996 Summer Olympics
Shooters at the 2000 Summer Olympics
Shooters at the 2004 Summer Olympics
Shooters at the 2008 Summer Olympics
Shooters at the 2012 Summer Olympics
Shooters at the 2016 Summer Olympics
Shooters at the 2020 Summer Olympics
Sportspeople from Kuwait City